The Sony FE 12-24mm F4 G is a constant maximum aperture ultra wide-angle full-frame (FE) zoom lens for the Sony E-mount, announced by Sony on May 17, 2017. The lens is scheduled for release in Fall 2017.

The lens is currently Sony's widest-angle native zoom lens for Sony E-mount cameras. Though designed for Sony's full frame E-mount cameras, the lens can be used on Sony's APS-C E-mount camera bodies, with an equivalent full-frame field-of-view of 18-36mm.

Build quality
The lens features a compact plastic construction with a matte black finish and the G-series badge on the side of the lens barrel. Just below the G-series badge is a programmable focus-hold button and an Autofocus-Manual focus switch. The lens does not feature image stabilization.

See also
List of Sony E-mount lenses
Sony FE 16-35mm F4 ZA OSS

References

Camera lenses introduced in 2017
12-24